Gorsedd Cymru, or simply the Gorsedd or the Orsedd, is a society of Welsh-language poets, writers, musicians and others who have contributed to the Welsh language and to public life in Wales. Its aim is to honour such individuals and help develop and promote their fields in addition to maintaining relationships with other Celtic nations and Y Wladfa. The Gorsedd is most prominent at the National Eisteddfod of Wales where it is responsible for the main ceremonies held.

Name
The word gorsedd (plural gorseddau) means "throne" in Welsh. Equivalent terms exist in Cornish (gorsedh) and Breton (goursez). When the term is used without qualification, it generally refers to the national Gorsedd of Wales, namely Gorsedd Cymru. Note that when referred to as simply "the Gorsedd" in Welsh, the initial g is dropped due to soft mutation, resulting in yr Orsedd. Other gorseddau exist outside of Wales, such as the Cornish Gorsedh Kernow and the Breton Goursez Vreizh.

Until 2019, Gorsedd Cymru was known as Gorsedd Beirdd Ynys Prydain ("the Gorsedd of the Bards of the Island of Britain"), or Gorsedd y Beirdd ("the Gorsedd of the bards") for short. At the Chairing Ceremony of 2019 National Eisteddfod, Archdruid Myrddin ap Dafydd announced that the society was to change its name to Gorsedd Cymru ("the Gorsedd of Wales"). This was deemed more "suitable for the modern Wales" and less "misleading" as the Gorsedd consists of more than just bards. The name change was approved by the Board of the Gorsedd, the Gorsedd membership and the Court of the National Eisteddfod. In spite of this, some felt unhappy with the decision, with academic Simon Brooks declaring that "227 years of history are in the balance", calling for a public enquiry into the change.

History
The Gorsedd was originally founded as Gorsedd Beirdd Ynys Prydain in 1792 by Edward Williams commonly known as Iolo Morganwg, who also invented much of its ritual, supposedly based on the activities of the ancient Celtic Druidry. Nowadays, much of its ritual has Christian influence, and was given further embellishment in the 1930s by Archdruid Cynan (Albert Evans-Jones, 1950–1954 and 1963–1966). The Gorsedd made its first appearance at the Eisteddfod at the Ivy Bush Inn in Carmarthen in 1819, and its close association with the festival has continued since then.

The fictitious origin of these ceremonies was established by Professor G.J. Williams in works touching on Iolo Morganwg.

Ranks
There are three ranks of membership in the Gorsedd. Until 2012 they were, in ascending order of honour:
 Ovates, who wear green robes (Green signifying a verdant spring)
 Bards, who wear blue robes, and (Blue signifying the season)
 Druids, who wear white robes. (White signifying old age and sanctity)

Since the 1960's onwards, the saturation of the robes, (primarily the green and blue) became more artificial in appearance , although it is not known why this shift occurred.

However, since 2012 all these ranks are treated as equal, with new members all being called 'druids' and with the colour of their robes reflecting the area of their contribution rather than an ascending order of honour. The head of a Gorsedd is known as an Archdderwydd (English: Archdruid), and wears a golden robe, and is elected for a term of three years, and is responsible for conducting the Gorsedd ceremonies during Eisteddfod week. These ceremonies are held to honour literary achievements amongst Welsh poets and prose writers.

Admission
In the Welsh Gorsedd, a person may become an ovate or a bard by passing an examination in the Welsh language. Druids may only be nominated by existing druids. Often a new inductee will take a pseudonym, called a "bardic name". To become an Archdruid, an individual must have won one of the Eisteddfod's three highest awards: the Crown, the Chair, or the Literature Medal. In 2003, Robyn Léwis (Robyn Llŷn) became the first winner of the Literature Medal to be elected Archdruid, and the first Archdruid to be elected by a vote of all Gorseddogion. Christine James was the first woman to become Archdruid of Wales and also the first woman to become Cofiadur (Recorder) of the Gorsedd.

People are also made ovates or druids as an honour to reward their contributions to Welsh culture. In 1946, the future Queen Elizabeth II was inducted into the Welsh Gorsedd at the National Eisteddfod of Wales, though in 2019 Archdruid Myrddin ap Dafydd declared that the Queen was now ineligible because she does not speak Welsh (since in 2006 "it was made clear you had to speak Welsh to be a member"). In recent years, Ron Davies, Rowan Williams, Matthew Rhys, Ioan Gruffudd and Rebecca Evans have been honoured in this way.

Ceremony
Three Gorsedd ceremonies are held during the Eisteddfod week:
 The Crowning (Coroni) of the Bard (awarded to the poet judged best in the competitions in free meter)
 The Awarding of the Prose Medal (for the winner of the Prose competitions)
 The Chairing (Cadeirio) of the Bard (for the best long poem in traditional strict metre).

During these ceremonies, the Archdruid and the members of the Gorsedd gather on the Eisteddfod stage in their ceremonial robes. When the Archdruid reveals the identity of the winning poet, the 'Corn Gwlad' (a trumpet) calls the people together and the Gorsedd Prayer is chanted (the Corn Gwlad symbolically calls everyone from the four corners of Wales). The Archdruid partially withdraws a sword from its sheath three times, and cries "A oes heddwch?" ("Is there peace?"), to which the assembly reply "Heddwch" ("Peace").  The sword is then placed fully back into its sheath, and hence is never drawn fully. Then the Horn of Plenty is presented to the Archdruid by a young local married woman, who urges him to drink the 'wine of welcome'. A young girl presents him with a basket of 'flowers from the land and soil of Wales' and a floral dance is performed, based on a pattern of flower gathering from the fields.

Symbolism

The symbol commonly used to represent a Gorsedd is a triple line, the middle line upright and the outer two slanted towards the top of the centre, thus: . This symbol, called "awen", is often explained as representing the sun. The word "awen" means "muse" in Welsh.

See also

 Archdruid (includes a chronological list of Archdruids)
 Gorsedh Kernow (Cornish Gorsedd)
 Goursez Vreizh (Breton Gorsedd)
 Gorsedd stones
 Order of Bards, Ovates and Druids
Oireachtas na Gaeilge
Mòd

References

 
Druidry
Eisteddfod
Poetry organizations
Spoken word